Maguy (Margaret)  Rashidi Kabamba (born 3 August 1960) is a writer and translator from the Democratic Republic of the Congo. She has a B.A. specialized in Translation from York University, Toronto, Canada and a M.A. with major French, minor Spanish from Saint-Louis University, St. Louis, MO. Her novel La Dette coloniale (The Colonial Debt) came out in 1995. The book takes a critical look at the belief many Africans  have that a better life can be found in Europe. Its title refers to a philosophy that acquisition of goods and money by any means (i.e. criminality) is a legitimate refund or entitlement. The phrase has been used frequently by Congolese leaders. Her second book is titled La réponse, another novel where she paints a picture of the current Congolese society.

During the 2007-2008 school year, she worked as a French I-III teacher at Dulles High School (Sugar Land, Texas).

Works
 La dette coloniale: roman . Montréal: Humanitas, 1995.
 La réponse: roman. Cork: BookBaby, 2013.

Notes

External links
 African Writers bio
 African Writers bio (same as above in French with more information)
 http://www.zibf.org.zw/pdfs/ChapterEleven.pdf

1960 births
Living people
People from South Kivu
Democratic Republic of the Congo translators
21st-century Democratic Republic of the Congo people